The Surrey City Council is the governing body of the City of Surrey, British Columbia, Canada.

The council consists of the mayor and eight elected city councillors representing the city as a whole. Municipal elections also select six school trustees.

Municipal elections are held every four years across the Province on the third Saturday of October.

2022-present 

Elected in the 2022 municipal election

2018–2022 

Elected in the 2018 municipal election

2014–2018 

Elected in the 2014 municipal election

References

External links
 Mayor & Council, City of Surrey website
 Surrey's Wardens, Reeves, Councillors, Aldermen, Mayors, and Councillors from 1879 to 2008, SurreyHistory.ca

Municipal councils in British Columbia
Politics of Surrey, British Columbia